Polyommatus aroaniensis, the Grecian anomalous blue, is a butterfly in the family Lycaenidae. It was described by John W. Brown in 1976. It is found on the Balkan Peninsula.

The wingspan is 28–32 mm. Adults are on wing from July to August.

The larvae feed on Onobrychis species.

References

Butterflies described in 1976
Polyommatus
Butterflies of Europe